The Lockhart Football and Netball Club is situated in the Riverina, New South Wales area and currently plays in the Hume Football League and fields four football and five netball teams in this competition.

History
The Lockhart Football Club (Australian Rules Football) was formed in April 1898, after a meeting at the Lockhart Hotel. and they defeated Urana in their first official game in August 1898.

In 1925, The Urangeline & DFA, had six teams in the competition and both Lockhart FC and Milbrulong FC were expelled from the competition on the eve of the finals series, for refusing to play their final at Urangeline. Urangeline FC were defeated by Osborne FC in the grand final played at Pleasant Hills and won Mrs Maloney's Cup.

In 1931, Lockhart was refused entry into The Rock & DFA

Lockhart played in four consecutive grand finals in The Rock & District Cricket Association between 1933 and 1936, winning two premierships.

Football Competitions
Lockhart FC have played in the following competitions - 

1905: Lockhart & District Football Association. 1905 Premiers, Napier South
1906: Greensgunyah Football Association. 1906 Premiers, Boree Creek
1907 - 1909: Lockhart & District Football Association. Premiers: 1907: Boree Creek; 1908: Napier South, 1909: Boree Creek,
1910 & 1911: The Rock Football Association. Premiers: 1910 - Milbrulong, finished on top of the ladder., 1911: Milbrulong
1912 - 1914: Lockhart & District Football Association: Premiers: 1912 - Boree Creek; 1913: Oaklands 1914: Urana 
1915 - 1917: Club in recess due to World War One
1918 - 1924: Lockhart & District Football Association. Premiers - 1918: Brookdale, 1920: Mt. Pleasant, 1921: Tootool, 1922: Lockhart, 1923: Oaklands, 1924: Oaklands
1925 - 1926: Urangeline Football Association
1927 & 1928: Osborne & District Football Association
1929 - Lockhart Lines Football Association. Premiers: Osborne
1930 - 1931: Active but did not play in an official competition. In 1931, Lockhart was refused entry into The Rock & DFA
1932 - 1939: The Rock And District Football League. Premiers: 1932 - The Rock; 1933 - Mangoplah, 1934 - Lockhart, 1935 - Lockhart, 1936 - The Rock, 1937 - Osborne, 1938 - Drawn grand final, 1938 - Grand final replay, Osborne won, 1939 - Milbrulong
1940: Lockhart & District Football Association. 1940 Premiers: Osborne
1941 - 1944: Club in recess due to World War Two
1945 - 1948: Milbrulong & District Football League
1949 - 1956: Central Riverina Football League
1957: Albury & District Football League. 1957 Premiers: Wagga
1958 - 1981: Farrer Football League 
1982 - 2022: Hume Football League

Football Premierships
Seniors
Lockhart Oaklands Lines Football Association
1922: Lockhart: 5.15 - 45 d Milbrulong: 3.3 - 21
The Rock & District Football Association
1934 - Lockhart: 9.13 - 67 d The Rock: 9.12 - 66 
1935 - Lockhart d  Milbrulong: by 12 points
Milbrulong & District Football League 
1948 - Lockhart: 9.14 - 68 d Yerong Creek: 9.13 - 67
Central Riverina Football League
1949 - Lockhart: 15.12 - 102 d Yerong Creek: 7.7 - 49
1956 - Lockhart: d Milbrulong:
Farrer Football League
1960 - Lockhart: 16.14 - 110 d Wagga Tigers: 14.10 - 94
Hume Football League
1982, 2003

Reserves
Hume Football League
2006

Football Runners Up
Seniors
Lockhart & District Football Association
1911, 1913, 1921
Urangeline Football Association
1926
The Rock & District Football Association
1933, 1936
Farrer Football League 
1959, 1968

Football Best and Fairest Awards
Farrer Football League - Baz Medal
Seniors
1959 - R Haberecht
1968 - John Wright
1972, 1973, 1975 - Jeff Nimmo

Hume Football League - Azzi Medal
Seniors
1982 - Graeme Johnstone
1991 - Warren Sykes
1998 - Shane Lennon
1999 - Paul Scoullar
2009 -  Nathan McPherson

Reserves
1985 - Peter Hyde
1999 - Rhys Kelly
2015 - Josh Firman

Leading Goalkicker
Seniors 
Farrer Football League
 1974 - Steven Goodwin: 111

Links
Albury & District Football League
Central Riverina Football League
Farrer Football League
Hume Football League
Australian rules football in New South Wales
Albury & DFL & Farrer FL Premiership & Best & Fairest Lists. 1930 to 1979 (page 20)

References

Sports clubs established in 1898
Australian rules football clubs established in 1898
1898 establishments in Australia
Netball teams in New South Wales
Australian rules football clubs in New South Wales